Kiryat Moshe is a neighborhood in Jerusalem, named for the British Jewish philanthropist Moses Montefiore. Kiryat Moshe is bordered by Givat Shaul.

History
 
Kiryat Moshe was founded in 1923 with funding from the Moses Montefiore Testimonial Fund in London. It was one of the garden suburbs established in Jerusalem in the 1920s, along with Beit Hakerem, Talpiot, Rehavia and Bayit VaGan. Designed by the German Jewish architect Richard Kauffmann, these neighborhoods were based on clusters of single family homes  surrounded by gardens and greenery. One of the main features was a central landscaped island, as can be seen on Hameiri Boulevard in Kiryat Moshe.

From the outset, Kiryat Moshe projected "Hebrew" pioneering, home to merchants and later teachers and bus drivers, both prestigious groups in the new Jewish society. Kiryat Moshe was designated as a national-religious neighborhood, and many rabbis and leaders of the Mizrachi movement settled there.

Schools and landmark buildings

Educational institutions in Kiryat Moshe include  Merkaz Harav yeshiva and Machon Meir.

Notable residents
Ben-Zion Dinur
Yehuda Liebes, Kabbalah scholar
Meir Shalev
Yitzhak Yaakov Yellin
Ishay Ribo, singer-songwriter

See also
Mercaz HaRav massacre

References

Orthodox Jewish communities in Jerusalem
1923 establishments in Mandatory Palestine